Nina Katrin Kaiser (born 14 October 1998), known professionally as Nina Chuba, is a German singer and actress. Chuba was born in Wedel, Schleswig-Holstein and rose to prominence in 2022 with her single "Wildberry Lillet", reaching #1 in both the Austrian and German charts.

At the age of seven, she began her acting career in the children's television series Die Pfefferkörner. Following a move to Berlin in 2018, Chuba began releasing music, with the English-language EPs Power and Average. In October 2021, she released her first German-language single "Neben mir". Her debut album Glas was released on 24th of February 2023. It reached sixth place in the global album debut charts on Spotify.

Discography

Studio albums

Singles

As lead artist

Awards 
1 Live Krone
 2022: in the category „Hip-Hop/R&B-Song“ (Wildberry Lillet)
 2022: in the category „Newcomer-Act“
HipHop.de-Awards
2022: Best female newcomer national

References



1998 births
Living people
German pop musicians
Meyer-Landrut, Lena